(born 1947) is a Japanese physicist. 

Independently of Joël Scherk and John H. Schwarz, he realized that string theory describes, among other things, the force of gravity. Yoneya has worked on the stringy extension of the uncertainty principle for many years.

Selected publications

"D-particles, D-instantons, and a space-time uncertainty principle in string theory." arXiv preprint hep-th/9707002 (1997).

"Gravity from strings: personal reminiscence on early developments." arXiv preprint arXiv:0901.0079 (2008).

References

External links

Living people
1947 births
People from Hokkaido
Japanese string theorists
Hokkaido University alumni
Academic staff of the University of Tokyo